Bifidunguiglenea gestroi is a species of beetle in the family Cerambycidae, and the only species in the genus Bifidunguiglenea. It was described by Gahan in 1895.

References

Saperdini
Beetles described in 1895